Khomeyn (also Romanized as Khowmeyn) is a city and capital of Khomeyn County, Markazi Province, Iran.  At the 2015 census, its population was 76,706 in 17,399 families.

The climate of Khomeyn is a moderate mountainous inclining to a semi-desert one. Winters are cold and summers are moderate. The name of Khomein was primarily mentioned in a book named The History of Prophets and Kings. Subterranean canals (qanats), sewers and its famous fire-temple can be named as some pre-Islamic relics. This town was called the center of Kamareh 200 years ago.

The house where former supreme leader Ayatollah Ruhollah Khomeini, the founder of the Islamic Republic of Iran, was born is located in Khomein, and was made into a museum. On 18 November 2022 during the Mahsa Amini protests, the house was set on fire.

Khomeini house
A family house in Khomeyn was the birthplace of former supreme leader Ayatollah Ruhollah Khomeini, the founder of the Islamic Republic of Iran. Birth certificates show that he was born on 24 September 1902 as the anniversary of the Prophet Muhammad's daughter Fatimah, but his actual birth date was 17 May 1900. The house became a historical monument and museum.

The house was set on fire on 17 November 2022 during the Mahsa Amini protests; and days after the death of Kian Pirfalak, an Iranian child killed during the Izeh Bazaar Massacre. Online social media showed a crowd cheering as flames were seen emerging from the house. Tasnim News Agency denied that a fire had occurred and stated that the house was "open to the public".

See also

Khomeini (name)
Ruhollah Khomeini
Hussein Khomeini

References

Populated places in Khomeyn County
Cities in Markazi Province
Ruhollah Khomeini